Gurdalu-ye Ab Razgeh (also Romanized as Gūrdālū-ye Āb Razgeh; also known as Gūrdālū) is a village in Tayebi-ye Garmsiri-ye Shomali Rural District, in the Central District of Landeh County, Kohgiluyeh and Boyer-Ahmad Province, Iran. At the 2006 census, its population was 24, in 4 families.

References 

Populated places in Landeh County